Donald Farquharson may refer to:
Donald Farquharson (athlete) (born 1925), Welsh athlete, early pioneer of Masters athletics 
Donald Farquharson (judge) (1928–2011), British judge
Donald Farquharson (politician) (1834–1903), Canadian politician, Premier of Prince Edward Island